Nicholas Borden is a British painter based in Hackney, London. He studied at Saint Martin's School of Art and then the Royal College of Art.

Nicholas Borden is the brother of photographer Harry Borden and painter Frances Borden.

References

External links

British painters
Alumni of Saint Martin's School of Art
Alumni of the Royal College of Art
1967 births
Living people
People from the London Borough of Hackney